is a Japanese shōjo manga artist. She was born in Kumamoto City, Kumamoto Prefecture. She debuted by publishing her work Kitty and a Girl (Koneko to Shōjo) in Shukan Margaret in 1971.

Ariyoshi is well known for her works of the ballet stories. Swan (Part 1, 1977 – 1980, and Part 2, 1980 – 1981), Swan -The Prayer of Swan- (1982–1983) and Applause are the representative works. These are all stories of ballet and ballerinas.

Works

References

External links
 Kyoko Ariyoshi manga listing at Media Arts Database 

People from Kumamoto
Manga artists
1950 births
Living people